David Winters (born 7 March 1982) is a Scottish former footballer and current assistant manager of Lowland League side Caledonian Braves.

Winters played as a striker and has previously played in the Scottish Premier League for Dundee United.

Career
Winters, like older brother Robbie, started his career with Dundee United and played in 19 league matches between 1999 and 2003. During this time, he had loans spells with Forfar Athletic and Ross County, and made the permanent move to Victoria Park in 2003.

After three seasons with The Staggies he moved to Hamilton Academical at the start of season 2006–07.  Winters spent the following pre-season at Halifax Town after turning down a deal from Hamilton at the end of the season.  He even played, and scored, as a trialist for Halifax against Hamilton in a friendly.  However, he signed a contract, until the end of the 2007–08 season, for Hamilton in August. Winters was released by Hamilton in January 2008 and rejoined Ross County in February. He joined Livingston in January 2009.

Winters moved to Dumbarton in March 2010, scoring three goals in his first five appearances.
Winters left Dumbarton in May 2010 and moved to Vietnam to play for Can Tho F.C. On 5 August 2011 Winters re-signed for Dumbarton on a one-year deal. He left in January 2012 after failing to establish himself in the Sons first eleven. After appearing as a trialist for Annan Athletic, Winters signed a deal until the end of the season, before moving on to Ayr United in the summer.

In August 2013, Winters joined Junior side Sauchie Juniors. In  March 2014, Winters joined Pollok. He started his impressive goal tally for the Southside Glasgow Giants with four goals on his debut. His seven goals in the final five games of the season could not prevent Lok from being relegated to the West First Division. In March 2015, Winters signed a contract extending his current contract for another year at Newlandsfield. With ten matches left in the league season, David's brother, Robbie joined Pollok on loan where the front two would spearhead their attack for the final run-in. Pollok were crowned First Division Champions in May 2015 with Winters scoring 34 Goals that season, with two coming in a 3–0 win in the Evening Times Winners' Cup Final against Blantyre Victoria – Robbie scoring the other. Since his 'Lok debut, he has only missed one competitive fixture through injury. He left Pollok in June 2017 following 127 appearances and 83 goals.

After leaving Pollok, Winters joined fellow Super League Premier Division team Kilwinning Rangers. After a season at Abbey Park, Winters moved to BSC Glasgow. In July 2019, he signed for Edusport Academy.

Winters announced his retirement from playing on 13 May 2021 while also announcing his new role as assistant manager of Lowland League side Caledonian Braves.

Personal life
Winters also coaches young people throughout Glasgow in his role with coaching and groupwork company A&M Training. He is married to former Scotland women footballer Suzanne Grant.

Honours
Hamilton Academical
 Scottish First Division: 2007–08

Ross County
 Scottish Second Division: 2007–08

Livingston
 Scottish Third Division: 2009–10

 Pollok
 West of Scotland Super League First Division: 2014–15
 Evening Times Cup Winners' Cup: 2014–15
 Central League Cup: 2015–16
 West of Scotland Junior Cup: 2016–17

 Kilwinning Rangers
 Ayrshire Junior Cup: 2017–18

 BSC Glasgow
Lowland League Cup: 2018–19

References

External links

1983 births
Footballers from Paisley, Renfrewshire
Living people
Scottish footballers
Dundee United F.C. players
Forfar Athletic F.C. players
Ross County F.C. players
Hamilton Academical F.C. players
Livingston F.C. players
Scottish Premier League players
Scottish Football League players
Dumbarton F.C. players
Ayr United F.C. players
Sauchie F.C. players
Scottish Junior Football Association players
Scottish expatriate footballers
Annan Athletic F.C. players
Pollok F.C. players
Arbroath F.C. players
Queen's Park F.C. players
Kilwinning Rangers F.C. players
Association football forwards
Broomhill F.C. (Scotland) players
Lowland Football League players
Caledonian Braves F.C. players